Courtland is a town in Panola County, Mississippi. The population was 511 at the time of the 2010 census.

History

Courtland, Mississippi was incorporated as a town on March 30, 1871. On July 17, 1946, acting Governor Fielding L. Wright issued a proclamation abolishing the town as it had not held a municipal election in over two years. On July 18, the area was reorganized into a village.

Geography
Courtland is located at  (34.239122, -89.942670).

Demographics

As of the census of 2000, there were 460 people, 157 households, and 127 families residing in the town. The population density was 408.1 people per square mile (157.2/km2). There were 169 housing units at an average density of 150.0 per square mile (57.7/km2). The racial makeup of the town was 64.57% White and 35.43% African American. Hispanic or Latino of any race were 1.30% of the population.

There were 157 households, out of which 43.3% had children under the age of 18 living with them, 59.9% were married couples living together, 19.1% had a female householder with no husband present, and 18.5% were non-families. 17.8% of all households were made up of individuals, and 6.4% had someone living alone who was 65 years of age or older. The average household size was 2.93 and the average family size was 3.32.

In the town, the population was spread out, with 32.6% under the age of 18, 7.4% from 18 to 24, 30.9% from 25 to 44, 19.3% from 45 to 64, and 9.8% who were 65 years of age or older. The median age was 32 years. For every 100 females, there were 100.0 males. For every 100 females age 18 and over, there were 86.7 males.

The median income for a household in the town was $35,729, and the median income for a family was $38,125. Males had a median income of $32,125 versus $19,375 for females. The per capita income for the town was $17,130. About 12.4% of families and 16.5% of the population were below the poverty line, including 17.4% of those under age 18 and 24.2% of those age 65 or over.

Education
The Town of Courtland is served by the South Panola School District.

Notable people 

 Calvin Chapman, MLB infielder and outfielder
 Ed Chapman, MLB pitcher
 Jermarcus Hardrick, gridiron football offensive lineman
 Lawrence B. McGill, actor, director, and writer

References

Towns in Panola County, Mississippi
Towns in Mississippi